Deutsche Flugsicherung (DFS) is the company in charge of air traffic control for Germany. It is a company organized under private law and 100% owned by the Federal Republic of Germany. Since January 1993, DFS has been controlling air traffic in Germany. In Germany, military and civil air traffic controllers work side by side. Since 1994, DFS has been responsible for the handling of both civil and military air traffic in peacetime. Only military aerodromes are exempted from this integration.

History  
The BFS was established in 1953 and closed in January 1993. Previously, DFS was founded as a private GmbH.

Running costs and fees 
DFS's running costs are covered by applicable route charges ("Flugsicherungsgebühren", collected by Eurocontrol for its 37 participating member states) and by approach and departure fees (determination by the BMVI by ordinance and collected directly by DFS)

According to the Gesellschaftsvertrag, DFS is a not-for-profit company. Any surpluses generated must also be repaid in accordance with the internationally accepted principles for the collection of air navigation charges to airspace users.

Area control centers 
DFS operates four area control centers located in:
Bremen
Langen, Hesse (HQ)
Karlsruhe
Munich

Towers 
DFS operates the air navigation services on behalf and at its own expense, as defined by the BMVI at the following airports:
 Berlin-Brandenburg - EDDB
 Bremen - EDDW
 Dresden - EDDC
 Düsseldorf - EDDL
 Erfurt - EDDE
 Frankfurt - EDDF
 Hamburg - EDDH
 Hanover - EDDV
 Cologne / Bonn - EDDK
 Leipzig / Halle - EDDP
 Munich - EDDM
 Munster / Osnabrück - EDDG
 Nuremberg - EDDN
 Saarbrücken - EDDR
 Stuttgart - EDDS

Trivia 
The DFS develops and uses Linux based Software for their purpose.

Notes

External links 
  (in English)

Aviation in Germany
Air navigation service providers
Government-owned companies of Germany